This is a list of mass shootings in the United States that have occurred in 2018. Mass shootings are incidents involving multiple victims of firearm-related violence. The precise inclusion criteria are disputed, and there is no broadly accepted definition.

Gun Violence Archive, a nonprofit research group that tracks shootings and their characteristics in the United States, defines a mass shooting as an incident in which four or more people, excluding the perpetrator(s), are shot in one location at roughly the same time. The Congressional Research Service narrows that definition, limiting it to "public mass shootings", defined by four or more victims killed, excluding any victims who survive. The Washington Post and Mother Jones use similar definitions, with the latter acknowledging that their definition "is a conservative measure of the problem", as many shootings with fewer fatalities occur. The crowdsourced Mass Shooting Tracker project has the most expansive definition of four or more shot in any incident, including the perpetrator in the victim inclusion criteria.

There were 323 mass shootings in 2018 that fit the inclusion criteria of this article, resulting in 387 deaths and 1,283 injuries, for a total of 1,670 victims.

Definitions 
There are many definitions of a mass shooting. Listed roughly from most broad to most restrictive:

 Mass Shooting Tracker: 4+ shot in one incident, at one location, at roughly the same time.
 Gun Violence Archive/Vox: 4+ shot in one incident, excluding the perpetrator(s), at one location, at roughly the same time.
 Mother Jones: 3+ shot and killed in one incident, excluding the perpetrator(s), at a public place, excluding gang-related killings.
 The Washington Post: 4+ shot and killed in one incident, excluding the perpetrator(s), at a public place, excluding gang-related killings.
 Congressional Research Service: 4+ shot and killed in one incident, excluding the perpetrator(s), at a public place, excluding gang-related killings, acts carried out that were inspired by criminal profit, and terrorism.

Only incidents considered mass shootings by at least two of the above sources are listed.

List 
Parenthetical number indicates the amount of mass shootings that occurred in that city year to date.

Statistics

Notes

See also 

List of school shootings in the United States (before 2000)
List of school shootings in the United States (2000–present)
List of school shootings in the United States by death toll

References

External links 
Gun Violence Archive Mass Shootings
Mass Shooting Tracker Mass Shootings
Mother Jones Mass Shootings
Vox Mass Shootings
Washington Post Mass Shootings
Active Shooter Incidents in the United States in 2018

Mass shootings in the United States
2018
2018